At the 1912 Summer Olympics, the men's individual cross country race was held as part of the athletics programme. It was the first appearance of the event. The competition was held on Monday, July 15, 1912. Forty-five runners from nine nations competed. NOCs could enter up to 12 athletes.

Results

The first three runners for each nation to finish in this race were also counted towards the team results.

References

Further reading
 
 

Cross country individual
1912